Cleaning For A Reason is a nonprofit organization that provides free house cleaning for cancer patients. It was founded by American businesswoman Debbie Sardone whose mother is a cancer survivor. Since its founding in 2006, Cleaning For A Reason has helped over 43,000 families battling cancer with free house cleaning services valued at over $14M. Over 1,200 maid services are part of the Cleaning For A Reason network.

Debbie Sardone started the organization after she received a phone call from a woman who was undergoing chemotherapy. She inquired about her house cleaning services but couldn't afford the cost because she was unemployed due to her cancer treatment.

Mike Gies currently serves as the nonprofit's executive director.

In 2015, Cleaning For A Reason was the subject of an Alt.news 26:46 documentary film.

References

 7.https://www.youvegotmaids.com/house-cleaning/cleaning-for-a-reason

External links
 

Non-profit organizations based in the United States
Non-profit organizations based in Texas